Contraband: The Best of Men at Work is the third compilation album by Australian pop rock band Men at Work, released in 1996. The album includes 16 tracks from the band's three studio albums. The album reached number 36 on the Official New Zealand Music Chart.

Reception 

Stephen Thomas Erlewine from AllMusic said "Contraband: The Best of Men at Work does a terrific job of consolidating all of their highlights onto one disc" and suggests that "for most [Men at Work] fans, it will be the only disc they need."

Track listing

Charts

Personnel 
 Colin Hay – vocals, guitar
 Ron Strykert – guitar, vocals
 Jerry Speiser – drums, vocals
 Greg Ham – saxophone, keyboards, vocals, flute, harmonica
 John Rees – bass, vocals

References 

Men at Work compilation albums
1996 greatest hits albums
Columbia Records compilation albums